Leverich is a surname. Notable people with the surname include:

Charles P. Leverich (1811–1880), American banker
James Earl Leverich (1891–1979), American politician

See also
Leverich Park, a park in Vancouver, Washington, United States